Yuksom is a historical town in Geyzing subdivision of West Sikkim district in the Northeast Indian state of Sikkim. It was the first capital of Kingdom of Sikkim established in 1642 AD by Phuntsog Namgyal who was the first Chogyal (temporal and religious king) of Sikkim. The coronation site of the first monarch of Sikkim is known as the "Throne of Norbugang". Yuksom is where there is the Norbugang Chorten near the Norbugang throne, the place Namgyal was crowned and several monasteries and a lake. The dynastic rule of the Chogyals lasted for 333 years.

The Chogyal established the first monastery at Yuksom in Sikkim known as the Dubdi Monastery in 1701, which is part of Buddhist religious pilgrimage circuit involving the Norbugang Chorten, Pemayangtse Monastery, the Rabdentse ruins, the Sanga Choeling Monastery, the Khecheopalri Lake, and the Tashiding Monastery.

For the Bhutia community of Sikkim, Yuksom has special religious and cultural significance. It has a number of famous Buddhist monasteries and historical monuments as well as ancient Gorkhas small Village.  Being at the head of the Khangchendzonga National Park and as the base camp for trekking to Mt. Khangchendzonga, it has large influx of mountaineers from all parts of the world. The village people, as stake holders in biodiversity preservation of the Rathong Chu valley, where the village is situated, have played a significant role in trendsetting and promotion of ecotourism in the area. The inhabitants of this village have most successfully adopted promotion of ecotourism not only in the region but also for other similar areas in Sikkim. Yuksom is thus considered a model village for eco-tourism.

Etymology
Yuksom literally means the "meeting place of the three learned monks" as three monks who came from Tibet selected Phuntsog Namgyal as the first King of Sikkim and gave him the title Chogyal. 'Chogyal' means "Religious King" or "the king who rules with righteousness". Yuksom is also one of  the sacred landscape "Demazong" (meaning a valley of rice) of four religious sites blessed by Guru Padmasambhava, which are considered to be the four plexuses of the human body, and Yuksom symbolically represents the 'third eye'.

History
Buddhism was introduced to the state from Tibet as early as the 9th century. In Tibet, the struggle  for power between the "Yellow hats" and the "Red hats" led to the latter migrating to Sikkim and converting the mild mannered local Lepchas to Buddhism. In the 13th century, relations between Sikkim and Tibet were cemented by a "Brotherhood treaty" signed between the Lepcha chief Thekong Thek and Tibetan prince Khe-Bhumsa at Kavi, in north Sikkim.

In 1641, Lama Lutsum Chembo travelled from Tibet to Denjong (meaning hidden country) now known as Sikkim to propagate the Buddhist religion. He was then joined by two other lamas, Sempa Chembo and Rinzing Chembo. The trinity of Lamas came from the Kham district in Tibet. Their primary aim was to perpetuate Tibetan hold on Sikkim and to propagate Buddhism in Sikkim. They assembled from different directions at Norbugang, which later came to be known as Yuksom. The area in the Rathong chu Valley at Narbugong was considered as blessed by the 9th century Guru Padmasambhava (Guru Rinpoche). In 1642 the Lamas went in pursuit of the fourth person, as the current three lamas represented three directions of North, South and West and Padmasambhava's vision  had predicted the requirement for a fourth person from the east. Near present-day Gangtok, they found a man churning milk. He offered them some refreshments and gave them shelter. So impressed were they by his deeds that they realised that he was a chosen one. They also identified Phunstsog Namgyal's ancestral royal links with Tibet and decided that he was the right person to become the temporal and religious head of the region so brought him to Yuksom. They then crowned him at Norbugang near Yuksom as the temporal and religious king of Sikkim, with the title "Chogyal". The crowning took place at Norbugang on a pedestal set in stones, in a pine-covered hill, and he was anointed by sprinkling water from a sacred urn. At that time he was 38 years of age. He was a fifth generation descendant of Guru Tashi, a 13th-century prince from the Mi-nyak House in Kham in Eastern Tibet.

Thereafter, the dynastic rule of Chogyals, propagation of the Buddhist religion and building of monasteries and chortens took firm roots in Sikkim. The Namgyal monarchy of 12 kings lasted from 1642 until 1975 (333 years). Tibetan Mahayana Buddhism known as Vajrayana sect was introduced, which ultimately was recognized as the state religion of Sikkim.

Geography and environment

It lies in a basin-like valley surrounded by mountain ranges. Located at the head of the Khangchendzonga National Park, it is the gateway to Mt. Kangchenjunga A popular mountaineering trek starts from Yuksom, which is well connected by a road network with Geyzing and Gangtok.

The climate in Yuksom, which is located at a moderate altitude, is pleasant from March to June and September to November, while in the winter season, the coldest months are December and February.

The natural environmental setting of the town, ensconced amidst rich forests is further accentuated by its history, architecture and Buddhist legacy that evolved from the 17th century with Yuksom's establishment as the first capital of Sikkim. Situated at the head of Khangchenjunga National Park, the largest Protected Area in Sikkim, and at starting gate for the trekking trail to Mt. Khangchendzonga, Yuksom and its hills was named in the past as Ney-Pemathang for its beautiful landscape. The forest cover in the hills consist of broad-leaved oak, birch, maple, chestnut, magnolia, rhododendron, silver fir, ash and alder, which complement the epithet of  "biodiversity hot-spot" given to Sikkim.

Administration

The first act that Phuntsog initiated after becoming the King was the conversion of the local Lepcha tribes to Buddhism and set about expanding his kingdom up to the Chumbi Valley in Tibet, parts of modern-day Darjeeling in the south, and parts of eastern Nepal. In this effort the three lamas also lent full support to him.

Phuntsog moved his capital to Yuksom and instituted the first centralised administration. The kingdom was divided into twelve Dzongs or districts under a Lepcha Dzongpon (governor) who headed a council of twelve ministers. During his reign Buddhism was consolidated as the established religion in Sikkim. He was succeeded by his son, Tensun Namgyal in 1670. However, the importance of Yuksum as capital ended when in 1670, Phuntsok Namgyal's son  Tensung Namgyal, shifted the capital to Rabdentse.

At present, Yuksam is a heritage village in the Geyzing subdivision of West District of Sikkim. It is now an important tourist destination. It is also the starting point of the popular trek to Goechala (via Dzongri). It is the base camp of Himalayan Mountaineering Institute for treks to Mt. Khangchendzonga.

Demographics
Yuksom is a well established village; according to 2001 census, there are 364 households in the village inhabited by 1,951 persons. However, the visiting population of tourists far exceeds the permanent population as it is on the trekking route and is also as a religious centre for Buddhists. In the village, the Bhutias and the Nepalese constitute major communities, with the Bhutia community being the dominant ethnic group. However, the service and the trading sectors are dominated by people from the plains.

Economy and facilities

With the Himalayan trekking to Khangchendzonga mountain and the Khangchendzonga National Park, centred in the Yuksom town as the base camp, the economy of the town has now become tourism centric. Consequently, the Khangchendzonga Conservation Committee (KCC) located at Yuksom, with the village community as the stakeholders, with Forest Department acting as the chief coordinating agency, have planned several innovative programmes to promote ecotourism, concurrent with encouragement of local handicrafts.

The village has well established primary and secondary schools. There are three primary schools, one junior school and a senior secondary school. Basic amenities of primary health, potable drinking water, gas and electric supply, post and telegraph office are all well established. To meet the increasing tourist inflow, infrastructure facilities such as hotels guest houses and transportation have also developed, although with attendant concerns of effect on biodiversity and ecological preservation. The environment awareness level is also very high among the village community so much so that the village is now at the core of social activists. They keep a close watch on the environmental and economic conditions in the village.

The Yuksom-Dzongri trek is a popular high altitude trek along the Rathong Chu River in West Sikkim. The trek passes through dense forests, alpine lakes and terminates at the Khangchendzonga. An ecotourism impact study of this route has been carried out jointly by the Forest Department, the Mountain Institute and the Khangchendzonga Conservation Committee (KCC), which is based in Yuksom. Considering that this route has recorded large number of visitors (mostly from England, United States, Germany, France, Australia, Netherlands and Switzerland) in the period between 1990 and 2005 (more than doubled in this period of 15 years), two main trekking seasons of March to May and September to November with October being the peak month have been noted. However, the winter months of January and February are the lean months. Based on this study, innovative additional trek routes have been planned to encourage ecotourism all through the year. The additional packages suggested are the "Monsoon Magic" Alpine Treks and Subtropical Winter Treks, which would promote ecotourism economy with due consideration of the carrying capacity of the region.

Culture

Biodiversity festival

As sequel to the above efforts by the local community, a biodiversity festival was held at Yuksom, for one day, the first of its kind to be held in Sikkim (the second festival was held at Chungthong) by KCC, and the Forest Department of Government of Sikkim. The objective of the festival was to create awareness among the people of the villages to conserve cultural and natural heritage. This festival was attended by 200 villagers and also some foreign tourists. In the festival the focus was on pictorial exhibitions of the natural biodiversity setting and cultural heritage of the Rathong Chuu valley, the steps taken to preserve and conserve the biosphere, interest of ecotourism in the valley along the trek route Yuksom Dzongri through the Khangchendzonga National Park, diverse exhibits relating to medicine, paper making, horticulture, Khecheopalri Lake pollution and actions for its preservation, effects of deforestation and need to preserve forest wealth, measures for hill slope stability, energy efficient methods for cooking using local produce, garbage reduction, replacement and reuse, composting with biodegradable wastes, promoting traditional handicrafts and handlooms (carpets, sheep wool blankets, etc.). Puppet shows, music and local dance programmes also formed part of the festival.

Monasteries
The Tibetan Buddhist monastery, Dubdi Monastery, is located in the area and also the smaller Mallu Monastery. Established in 1701, Dubdi Monastery professes to be the oldest monastery in Sikkim and is located at the top of a hill about an hour's walk from Yuksom. It was also known as the Hermit's Cell after its reclusive founder Lhatsun Namkha Jigme.

Gallery

References

External links

Films
 Singalila in the Himalaya
 Goecha La: In Search of Kangchenjunga by George Thengummoottil http://www.theindia.info/Goecha_La:_In_Search_of_Kangchenjunga Film speaks about Yuksum and Goecha La trekking in Sikkim

Cities and towns in Gyalshing district
Hill stations in Sikkim